Stanislas Solaux (born 4 December 1975) is a French former ice hockey forward.

Solaux played in the Ligue Magnus for Dauphins d'Épinal, Dragons de Rouen and Anglet Hormadi Élite between 1996 and 2007. He played in the 1998 World Championship for France.

References

External links

1975 births
Living people
Anglet Hormadi Élite players
Dauphins d'Épinal players
Dragons de Rouen players
French ice hockey forwards
People from Saint-Saulve
Sportspeople from Nord (French department)